Williamstown Cemetery is located in the Melbourne suburb of Williamstown North, Victoria, Australia. The main entrance is on Champion Road, Williamstown North. The Cemetery is managed by Greater Metropolitan Cemeteries Trust (GMCT). Williamstown Cemetery is on the Victorian Heritage Register.

History
The cemetery contains re-interred remains from the Point Gellibrand Cemetery.

Williamstown Cemetery was established in 1858 and the first burial was of Captain Lawrence Lawson, a Master
Mariner.

In March 2010, the Fawkner Memorial Park Trust was amalgamated with 7 other Trusts and formed the Greater Metropolitan Cemeteries Trust (GMCT) which now manages the Williamstown Cemetery and 18 other sites.

Notable Burials
 Dick Bliss, Australian rules footballer
 Robert L. J. Ellery, government astronomer
 Reginald Sturgess, artist

War graves
The cemetery contains the war graves of 61 Commonwealth service personnel 32 of World War I and 29 of World War II.

References

External links 
 Williamstown Cemetery  Billion Graves
 Williamstown Cemetery Australian Cemeteries

1858 establishments in Australia
Cemeteries in Melbourne
Commonwealth War Graves Commission cemeteries in Australia
Buildings and structures in the City of Hobsons Bay
Heritage-listed buildings in Melbourne